Nicholas James Kobasew (born April 17, 1982) is a Canadian former professional ice hockey right winger who played eleven seasons in the National Hockey League (NHL).

Playing career

Amateur
Kobasew is from the town of Osoyoos, British Columbia, 398 kilometres east of Vancouver. He spent one season playing at Boston College, starring on a team which won the National Championship and was loaded with players headed to the NHL. At the 2001 NCAA Frozen Four, the Eagles defeated the North Dakota Fighting Sioux 3-2 in overtime. Kobasew was named MVP for the tournament.

Professional
Kobasew was drafted by the Calgary Flames in the first round (14th overall) in the 2001 NHL Entry Draft. During the 2004–05 NHL lockout, Kobasew played with the American Hockey League (AHL)'s Lowell Lock Monsters, and helped the team reach a number of franchise records. He was named as team captain, and scored 75 points in 79 games. He was also selected to play for the Canadian contingent at that year's All-Star game.

While playing for the Flames, Kobasew scored his first career hat trick against the Colorado Avalanche on January 24, 2006.

On February 10, 2007, Kobasew and Andrew Ference were traded by the Flames to the Boston Bruins in exchange for Brad Stuart and Wayne Primeau. On May 13, 2008, Kobasew signed a 3-year contract extension with the Bruins worth $7 million. Kobasew scored 21 goals along with 21 assists during the 2008-09 NHL Season as the Bruins reached the Eastern Conference Semi-Finals.

Kobasew was traded by the Bruins to the Minnesota Wild in exchange for Craig Weller, a second round pick in 2011, and the rights to prospect Alexander Fallstrom on October 18, 2009. On November 27, 2009, Kobasew scored his second career hat trick similarly against the Colorado Avalanche.

On July 1, 2011, Kobasew agreed to a two-year deal worth $1.25 million per year with the Colorado Avalanche. Kobasew made his Avalanche debut on opening night of the 2011–12 season in a 3-0 defeat to the Detroit Red Wings on October 8, 2011. Whilst entrenched on the Avalanche in a checking line role, Kobasew appeared in his 500th game, along with linemate Jay McClement, on December 8, 2011, against his original club, the Calgary Flames. He reached another milestone on December 31, when he scored his 100th career NHL goal, a game-winner, in a 4-2 victory over the Anaheim Ducks. Whilst impeded with various injuries throughout the season, Kobasew finished his first year with the Avalanche with 7 goals and 14 points in 58 games.

In the final year of his contract in the lockout shortened 2012–13 season, Kobasew was primarily limited to a fourth line role with the Avalanche. On March 20, 2013, Kobasew recorded his 100th career assist, added a late game-winning goal and recorded a career high Plus/minus 4 in a 4-3 victory over the Dallas Stars. He compiled 5 goals and 9 points in 37 games as Colorado failed to reach the playoffs for a third consecutive season.

After the expiration of his contract with the Avalanche, Kobasew spent the off-season unsigned before accepting an invitation on September 11, 2013,  to attend the Pittsburgh Penguins 2013 training camp on a professional try-out contract. On October 2,  he signed a one-year, $550,000 contract with the team. In the 2013–14 season with the Penguins, Kobasew was used primarily in a checking depth role. After scoring only 2 goals in 33 games, Kobasew was placed on waivers and assigned to AHL affiliate, the Wilkes-Barre/Scranton Penguins. In playing at the AHL level for the first time in 9 years, Kobasew regained his scoring prowess with 11 goals in 12 games.

Kobasew signalled the end of his NHL career, in signing his first European contract on a two-year deal with Swiss club, SC Bern of the National League A (NLA) on July 1, 2014. During the 2015–16 season, in which Bern won the Swiss championship, Kobasew saw action in only ten games due to a concussion, suffered in October 2015. He would not return to play professionally due to his injury.

Career statistics

Regular season and playoffs

International

Awards and honours

References

External links
 

1982 births
SC Bern players
Boston Bruins players
Boston College Eagles men's ice hockey players
Canadian people of Russian descent
Calgary Flames draft picks
Calgary Flames players
Canadian ice hockey right wingers
Colorado Avalanche players
Ice hockey people from British Columbia
Kelowna Rockets players
Living people
Lowell Lock Monsters players
Minnesota Wild players
National Hockey League first-round draft picks
People from Osoyoos
Pittsburgh Penguins players
Saint John Flames players
Wilkes-Barre/Scranton Penguins players
Canadian expatriate ice hockey players in Switzerland
NCAA men's ice hockey national champions